Debbie Freeman (born 5 June 1962) is an Australian former tennis player who won Junior Wimbledon in 1980.

In 1978, Freeman won the Australian Open Girls' Doubles title with Kathy Mantle.
 
In 1980, Freeman became the first Australian to win Girls' Singles title at Wimbledon. Freeman received a telegram from the Prime Minister of Australia, Malcolm Fraser, congratulating her on her win. The next Australian to win the Junior Girls Wimbledon title was Ashleigh Barty in 2011.

Freeman failed to capitalise on her Junior titles, losing first-round matches at the US Open, Wimbledon and the French Open in the following year. She retired from professional tennis soon after.

References

External links
 

1962 births
Living people
Australian female tennis players
Australian Open (tennis) junior champions
Sportswomen from New South Wales
Tennis players from Sydney
Wimbledon junior champions
Grand Slam (tennis) champions in girls' singles
20th-century Australian women